Alessandro Capriolo was an Italian engraver and printer.

He was born in Trento in 1557, but moved to Rome in 1580 to become a printer. He engraved an Assumption based on a fresco by Zuccari, a Mary Magdalen based on a design of the Flemish painter and draughtsman Maerten de Vos, and others.

Sources

Italian engravers
Italian printers
People from Trento
16th-century engravers
1557 births
Year of death unknown